Patareshnes (Ptahreshnes), formerly (and mistakenly) read as Penreshnes,  was a consort of Pharaoh Shoshenq I. Her name means "the land rejoices in her." She was the mother of Nimlot B, the Overseer of the Army of Neni-nesu (Herakleopolis Magna). The names of her parents are not known, but her father held the title "Great Chief of the Foreigners," indicating he was Libyan. Patareshnes is known from a number of documents, particularly a statue of her son Nimlot B now in Vienna (ÄOS 5791).

References

Queens consort of the Twenty-second Dynasty of Egypt
10th-century BC Egyptian women